Nathan J. Brown (born 17 December 1988) is a former professional Australian rules footballer who played for the Collingwood Football Club and the St Kilda Football Club in the Australian Football League (AFL).

Early life
Brown is a former student of St Patrick's College, Ballarat. He was part of their 1st XVIII that won the coveted Herald Sun Shield in 2005. Tall and mobile, Brown is a former basketballer who converted to football and was  earmarked for centre halfback, following some well acclaimed performances for Vic Country in the 2006 Under 18 National Championships.

Career
Brown became the third player with the same name in the AFL when he was selected by Collingwood with the 10th selection in the 2006 National AFL Draft.

Brown made his debut for Collingwood in Round 1 of the 2008 season against Fremantle at the Melbourne Cricket Ground in front of 45,000 fans. He immediately made impressions with speed and great defensive attributes against Matthew Pavlich, who is recognised as one of the best forwards in the game, holding him to only one goal. He would follow up immediately, playing on one of the competition's best players, Jonathan Brown of the Brisbane Lions, and Matthew Richardson of Richmond in the next fortnight, holding each to two and one goal(s) respectively.

Even though Brown was yet to make his senior debut, he was selected as the Collingwood alternative delegate for the AFL Players Association in 2008, behind Tarkyn Lockyer and Nick Maxwell.

Brown was nominated for the AFL Rising Star Award for his performance in Round 10 2008 against the West Coast Eagles in which Collingwood won by 100 points.

Brown won the Harry Collier Trophy (Best First Year Player) in 2008.

Brown celebrated his 50th game in the 2010 AFL Grand Final replay.

At the conclusion of the 2016 season, Brown joined the St Kilda Football Club as a restricted free agent after Collingwood elected not to match the contract offer.

In August 2018, Brown was sent straight to the AFL Tribunal following a late bump on  player Adam Saad. He was suspended for three matches.

Personal life
He has a twin brother, Mitch Brown, who played for the West Coast Eagles and an older brother named Cameron. As a child he was a Carlton supporter, while his twin brother was a Collingwood supporter.

Statistics
 Statistics are correct to the end of the 2019 season

|- style="background-color: #EAEAEA"
! scope="row" style="text-align:center" | 2008
|style="text-align:center;"|
| 16 || 23 || 4 || 2 || 94 || 86 || 180 || 41 || 53 || 0.2 || 0.1 || 4.1 || 3.7 || 7.8 || 1.8 || 2.3
|- 
! scope="row" style="text-align:center" | 2009
|style="text-align:center;"|
| 16 || 14 || 2 || 2 || 51 || 78 || 129 || 40 || 26 || 0.1 || 0.1 || 3.6 || 5.6 || 9.2 || 2.9 || 1.9
|- style="background:#eaeaea;"
! scope="row" style="text-align:center" | 2010
|style="text-align:center;"|
| 16 || 13 || 0 || 0 || 49 || 73 || 122 || 36 || 25 || 0.0 || 0.0 || 3.8 || 5.6 || 9.4 || 2.8 || 1.9
|- 
! scope="row" style="text-align:center" | 2011
|style="text-align:center;"|
| 16 || 0 || — || — || — || — || — || — || — || — || — || — || — || — || — || —
|- style="background:#eaeaea;"
! scope="row" style="text-align:center" | 2012
|style="text-align:center;"|
| 16 || 18 || 0 || 0 || 84 || 87 || 171 || 57 || 33 || 0.0 || 0.0 || 4.7 || 4.8 || 9.5 || 3.2 || 1.8
|- 
! scope="row" style="text-align:center" | 2013
|style="text-align:center;"|
| 16 || 22 || 1 || 1 || 87 || 117 || 204 || 89 || 37 || 0.0 || 0.0 || 4.0 || 5.3 || 9.3 || 4.0 || 1.7
|- style="background:#eaeaea;"
! scope="row" style="text-align:center" | 2014
|style="text-align:center;"|
| 16 || 3 || 0 || 0 || 10 || 8 || 18 || 2 || 1 || 0.0 || 0.0 || 3.3 || 2.7 || 6.0 || 0.7 || 0.3
|- 
! scope="row" style="text-align:center" | 2015
|style="text-align:center;"|
| 16 || 21 || 0 || 0 || 107 || 118 || 225 || 66 || 46 || 0.0 || 0.0 || 5.1 || 5.6 || 10.7 || 3.1 || 2.2
|- style="background:#eaeaea;"
! scope="row" style="text-align:center" | 2016
|style="text-align:center;"|
| 16 || 16|| 0 || 0 || 84|| 91 || 175 || 65 || 28 || 0.0 || 0.0 || 5.3 || 5.7 || 10.9 || 4.1 || 1.8
|- style="background:#eaeaea;"
! scope="row" style="text-align:center" | 2017
|style="text-align:center;"|
| 22 || 22 || 0 || 0 || 43|| 111 || 154 || 28 || 33 || 0.0 || 0.0 || 2.0 || 5.0 || 7.0 || 1.3 || 1.5
|- style="background:#eaeaea;"
! scope="row" style="text-align:center" | 2018
|style="text-align:center;"|
| 22 || 15 || 0 || 0 || 41 || 70 || 110 || 32 || 27 || 0.0 || 0.0 || 2.7 || 4.7 || 7.4 || 2.1 || 1.8
|- style="background:#eaeaea;"
! scope="row" style="text-align:center" | 2019
|style="text-align:center;"|
| 22 || 16 || 0 || 0 || 64 || 66 || 130 || 42 ||26 || 0.0 || 0.0 || 4.0 || 4.1 || 8.1 || 2.6 || 1.6
|- style="background:#eaeaea;"
-
|- class="sortbottom"
! colspan=3| Career
! 183
! 7
! 5
! 714
! 905
! 1619
! 498
! 335
! 0.1
! 0.0
! 3.9
! 5.0
! 8.9
! 2.7
! 1.8
|}

References

External links

 

1988 births
Collingwood Football Club players
Collingwood Football Club Premiership players
Living people
Greater Western Victoria Rebels players
Australian twins
Twin sportspeople
Australian rules footballers from Ballarat
People educated at St Patrick's College, Ballarat
St Kilda Football Club players
Sandringham Football Club players
One-time VFL/AFL Premiership players